The Canadian Restaurant and Foodservices Association or CRFA was an industry and advocacy group organizing the Canadian restaurant, foodservice and catering industry. Since 2014 it has been known as Restaurants Canada.
In Canada, entrepreneurs in the sector and their employees produce over $85 billion in gross sales at 97,000 establishments.  The association provides services to its members in the industry, including advice, advocacy on regulatory matters, and periodical publications.

References

External links 
 Official Website

Food industry trade groups
Trade associations based in Canada